21st Battalion may refer to:

21st Battalion (Australia), a World War I ANZAC battalion
2/21st Battalion (Australia), a World War II Australian infantry battalion
 21st Battalion (New Zealand), a World War II New Zealand infantry battalion
21st Battalion (Eastern Ontario), CEF, a World War I battalion that formed part of the Canadian Corps
21st Battalion, London Regiment (First Surrey Rifles)

See also
 XXI Corps (disambiguation)
 21st Division (disambiguation)
 21st Brigade (disambiguation)
 21st Regiment (disambiguation)
 21st Squadron (disambiguation)